Five Across the Eyes is a suspense/horror film directed by Greg Swinson and Ryan Thiessen and produced by Trauma One Entertainment. It was shot in 2005 in Morristown, Tennessee, and neighboring Greene County, Tennessee.

Plot
On their way home from a football game, five high school girls get lost in an area known as "the eyes". An ensuing accident with a parked SUV in a store parking lot causes the students to panic and flee the scene. A vehicle with one headlight starts to follow them until the driver traps them on a deserted road. The driver thinking that they wrecked her marriage forces the five girls from their vehicle, forces them to strip and urinate on their clothing at gunpoint. After letting them go the driver continues to pursue them throughout the film and performs several violent and sexual acts on them. The girls also discover that in the back of the driver's truck there are dead bodies. They get their revenge however, when they stab the driver multiple times with a screwdriver and light her corpse on fire. They eventually return to the store to find that the driver killed everyone in the store and drove off. The movie ends with the girls driving off into the night, one of them puking and then another girl who is driving tells her not to mess up her mother's car.

Cast
 Jennifer Barnett as Stephanie
 Angela Brunda as Caroline
 Danielle Lilley as Jamie
 Sandra Paduch as Isabella
 Mia Yi as Melanie
 Veronica Garcia as The Driver

Production
The script was originally entitled 'Pumpkins' and written by Marshall Hicks, who attended film school with Greg Swinson. The film was shot over the course of nine days in June 2005 with three MiniDV camcorders.

Film festivals 
The film was chosen to be part of the "Fantastic Fest 2007".

Alternate titles 
 Perdidas (Spain)
 Perdidas en la noche (Argentina)
Carretera Sangrienta (Mexico)
 Perdidas na escuridão (Portugal)
 5 Vite All'Inferno (Italy)

Reviews 
 America JR 
 About.com
 Pop Syndicate 
 Den of Geek

References

External links
 
 
 "Interview with directing team behind Five Across the Eyes", Eat My Brains. May 2008 (Retrieved November 8, 2008)
Lines, Craig "Greg Swinson and Ryan Thiessen on Five Across the Eyes", Den of Geek. (Retrieved November 8, 2008)

2006 films
2006 horror films
American horror films
American independent films
Films shot in Tennessee
American rape and revenge films
2000s English-language films
2000s American films